Absolutely Free is the second studio album by American rock band the Mothers of Invention, released on May 26, 1967, by Verve Records. Much like their 1966 debut Freak Out!, the album is a display of complex musical composition with political and social satire. The band had been augmented since Freak Out! by the addition of woodwinds player Bunk Gardner, keyboardist Don Preston, rhythm guitarist Jim Fielder, and drummer Billy Mundi; Fielder quit the group before the album was released, and his name was removed from the album credits.

Overview
The album's emphasis is on interconnected movements, as each side of the original vinyl LP comprises a mini-suite. It also features one of the most famous songs of frontman Frank Zappa's early career, "Brown Shoes Don't Make It", a track which has been described as a "condensed two-hour musical".

In the book Necessity Is..., former Mothers of Invention band member Ray Collins said that Absolutely Free is probably his favorite of the classic Mothers albums.

Reissues
The CD reissue adds, between sides one and two, two songs that were featured on a rare Verve single of the time. The songs from the single, "Why Dontcha Do Me Right?" (titled "Why Don't You Do Me Right" on the 45) and "Big Leg Emma", were both described as "an attempt to make dumb music to appeal to dumb teenagers".

The UK-67 release (Verve VLP/SVLP 9174) came in a laminated flip-back cover, with a Mike Raven poem at the reverse that was not on any other issue.

Music

"Plastic People" begins with a mock introduction of the President of the United States, who (along with his wife) can only recite the opening notes to "Louie, Louie".  "Louie, Louie" is often interpolated in Zappa's compositions (other examples appear in the Uncle Meat and Yellow Shark albums, among others), and when Zappa first began performing "Plastic People" around 1965, the words were set to the tune of "Louie, Louie".

The title of "Brown Shoes Don't Make It" was inspired by an event covered by Time reporter Hugh Sidey in 1966. The reporter correctly guessed something was wrong when the fastidiously dressed President Lyndon B. Johnson made the fashion faux pas of wearing brown shoes with a gray suit. LBJ flew to Vietnam for a surprise public relations visit later that day.

In the songs "America Drinks" and "America Drinks and Goes Home", Zappa combines a silly tune with nightclub sound effects to parody his experiences playing with drunken lounge music bands during the early 1960s. Other songs recorded soon after that used the same kinds of ideas include "On with the Show" by the Rolling Stones (released in 1967), "My Friend" by Jimi Hendrix (recorded in 1968, released in 1971) and "You Know My Name (Look Up the Number)" by the Beatles (recorded in 1967 and 1969, released in 1970).

Cultural references

It is not unusual to find melodies or scores from other composers within the music of Frank Zappa. Absolutely Free is full of musical references to other compositions and artists, including Igor Stravinsky.

For example, "Amnesia Vivace" begins with a collage of quotations from Stravinsky ballets:  first, the band plays the "Ritual Action of the Ancestors" from The Rite of Spring, Part II; then harpsichord and chattering voices evoke the pounding Dance of the Adolescents in Part I, over which sax and Zappa's voice start quoting the bassoon melody at the very opening of the Rite and continue into the lyrical Berceuse (also for bassoon) at the end of Stravinsky's The Firebird. The opening sequence of Petrouchka is quoted in the middle section of "Status Back Baby". "Soft-Sell Conclusion" ends with a version of the trombone melody that opens Stravinsky's "Marche Royale" from The Soldier's Tale.

The "Invocation & Ritual Dance of the Young Pumpkin", in the beginning of the saxophone solo (first cadence) quotes the trio directly from the fourth movement of Gustav Holst's The Planets, Jupiter, the Bringer of Jollity.

The melody to "The Duke of Prunes" is the love theme from Zappa's own film score to Run Home Slow.

Track listing

Personnel
The Mothers of Invention
 Frank Zappa – guitar, conductor, vocals
 Jimmy Carl Black – drums, vocals
 Ray Collins – vocals, tambourine, harmonica
 Roy Estrada – bass, vocals
 Billy Mundi – drums, percussion
 Don Preston – keyboards
 Jim Fielder (Uncredited) – guitar, piano
 Bunk Gardner – woodwinds

Additional musicians

 Suzy Creamcheese (Lisa Cohen) – vocals on "Brown Shoes Don't Make It"
 John Balkin – bass on "Invocation & Ritual Dance of the Young Pumpkin" and "America Drinks"
 Jim Getzoff – violin on "Brown Shoes Don't Make It"
 Marshall Sosson – violin on "Brown Shoes Don't Make It"
 Alvin Dinkin – viola on "Brown Shoes Don't Make It"
 Armand Kaproff – cello on "Brown Shoes Don't Make It"
 Don Ellis – trumpet on "Brown Shoes Don't Make It"
 John Rotella – contrabass clarinet on "Brown Shoes Don't Make It"
 Herb Cohen – cash register machine sounds on "America Drinks & Goes Home"
 Terry Gilliam, girlfriend and others – voices in "America Drinks & Goes Home"

Note
(Jim Sherwood was credited as a member of The Mothers on the album's original release, but he actually joined the band during the recording of We're Only in It for the Money, and he isn't featured on this album.)

Production
 Frank Zappa – producer, arranger, layout design, cover art, collage, liner notes
 Tom Wilson – producer
 Val Valentin – director of engineering
 Ami Hadani – engineer
 David Greene – remixing
 Doug Sax – mastering
 Ferenc Dobronyi – cover design
 Cal Schenkel – cover design
 Alice Ochs – cover photo, artwork
 Jerry Deiter – photography

Charts

References

External links
Lyrics and information
Release details
"The Meaning of Cordovans" reporter Hugh Sidey recalls the event when he saw Lyndon B. Johnson wearing the wrong shoes

1967 albums
Frank Zappa albums
Concept albums
Albums produced by Tom Wilson (record producer)
Verve Records albums
The Mothers of Invention albums
Albums produced by Frank Zappa
Albums arranged by Frank Zappa
Albums conducted by Frank Zappa
Avant-pop albums